Flaming Gorge National Recreation Area is a United States national recreation area in Wyoming and Utah.

History
The area was given the name "Flaming Gorge" by John Wesley Powell during his 1869 expedition down the Green River,  due to the spectacular, gorgeous red sandstone cliffs that surround this part of the river.

The Flaming Gorge reservoir was created by the 1964 construction of the Flaming Gorge Dam across the Green River.

Uses

Power
Flaming Gorge Dam is used to generate hydroelectric power.  Three turbines and generators at the base of the dam have the capacity to produce 50,650 kilowatts of electrical power each.

Recreation
Flaming Gorge National Recreation area is administered by the Ashley National Forest.

Activities in the recreation area include camping, biking, rock climbing, paddling, hiking, boating and fishing on the Flaming Gorge Reservoir, and rafting on the portion of the Green River downstream from Flaming Gorge Dam.

References

External links

 Flaming Gorge National Recreation Area USFS website
 usgs.gov: Geology of the Flaming Gorge area

National Recreation Areas of the United States
Parks in Utah
Parks in Wyoming
Ashley National Forest
Green River (Colorado River tributary)
Protected areas of Daggett County, Utah
Protected areas of Sweetwater County, Wyoming
Protected areas on the Colorado River
Canyons and gorges of Utah
Canyons and gorges of Wyoming
Protected areas established in 1968
1968 establishments in Utah
1968 establishments in Wyoming
Tourist attractions in Daggett County, Utah
Tourist attractions in Sweetwater County, Wyoming